The women's 100 metres hurdles competition at the 1976 Summer Olympics in Montreal, Quebec, Canada was held at the Olympic Stadium on July 28–29.

Competition format
The Women's 100m hurdles competition consisted of heats (Round 1), Semifinals and a Final. The four fastest competitors from each race in the heats qualified for the semifinals. The top four athletes from each semifinals race advanced to the final.

Records
Prior to this competition, the existing world and Olympic records were as follows:

Results

Round 1
Qual. rule: first 4 of each heat (Q) qualified.

Heat 1

Heat 2

Heat 3

Heat 4

Semifinals
Qual. rule: first 4 of each heat (Q) qualified.

Heat 1

Heat 2

Final

References

External links
 Official Olympic Report , la84foundation.org. Retrieved August 20, 2012.

Athletics at the 1976 Summer Olympics
Sprint hurdles at the Olympics
1976 in women's athletics
Women's events at the 1976 Summer Olympics